The Occupation of Ningbo was the five-month period in 1861 and 1862 during which the Taiping Heavenly Kingdom successfully occupied the city of Ningbo during the Taiping Rebellion.  British and French support eventually allowed the Qing to retake the city.

Fall of Ningbo
In December 1861, the Taiping, having already controlled the hinterlands of Zhejiang for many months, began marching on Ningbo under the command of Huang Chengzhong and Fan Youzeng. When the Taiping neared the city, they were approached by British, French, and American diplomats who attempted to dissuade them from taking the city.  Although Western diplomats had previously been successful in warning off the Taipings, they were ultimately only able to extract promises that foreign interests would not be harmed. On December 9, 1861, 60,000 Taiping stormed Ningbo. Despite the fact that the British had been training the local Qing forces, there was no military opposition to the Taiping's capture Ningbo.

Occupation of Ningbo
The capture of Ningbo provided the Taiping with access to the sea and the opportunity to demonstrate that Taiping rule would not harm foreign interests.  Initially, foreign reaction to the occupation was positive, even from those who were normally critical of the Taiping, such as Harry Parkes and S. Wells Williams. However, although the Taiping were well-disciplined and took steps conducive to trade, later missives became more negative and the British began to prepare for an eventual retaking of the city by the Qing.

Chen Zhengyue, a bagongsheng and member of the wealthiest household in Ying County, developed a plan to retake Ningbo.  He convinced the Qing troops to attempt to retake Ningbo, collaborated with foreign armies to organize an allied action, and provided funding for the expedition.

Retaking Ningbo
On May 10, 1862, Zheng Afu, the personal servant of Frederick E. B. Harvey, and Apak, a coastal pirate who commanded a fleet of 150 small, armed boats, successfully incited a British attack by firing upon  from the Taiping side of the river. This false flag attack killed two British soldiers and caused Roderick Dew, the commander of the Encounter, and the French to begin a full-scale artillery barrage on the Taiping with six gunships. Peasants and pirates then stormed Ningbo.  Zheng was personally responsible for directing the torture and summary execution of captives in the aftermath of the operation.

Aftermath
After Ningbo was retaken by the Qing, Apak and his pirate fleet began blockading the river and disrupting trade with the city.

Footnotes

References
 
 

Ningbo
19th century in China
Military history of Zhejiang
Ningbo
Ningbo